Blackjack is a 1978 American crime drama film written and directed by John Evans and starring Tony Burton, William Smith, and Damu King, and John Alderman.

Premise
Roy, the leader of a group of criminals, is released from prison and launches a big plan to rob the mafia controlled casinos in Las Vegas. Andy Mayfield (William Smith), a casino boss, tries to stop them.

Cast
 William Smith as Andy Mayfield (credited as Bill Smith)
 Tony Burton as Charles
 Frank Christi as Joe Greene (credited as Frank R. Christi)
 Damu King as Roy King
 Paris Earl as Ojenke
 Ernie Banks as "Turbo"
 Ted Harris as Akbar
 Tom Scott as "Teach"
 Diane Sommerfield as Nancy
 Angela May as Valery
 John Alderman as Phil Kastel
 Alan Oliney as Dealer
 Gerald White as Pit Boss
 Sandy Clory as 1st Girl
 Vicki Le Mere as 2nd Girl

References

External links
 

1978 films
American crime drama films
American heist films
Blaxploitation films
Films set in the Las Vegas Valley
Films about gambling
1978 drama films
1970s English-language films
1970s American films